John M. O'Bannon III (born February 14, 1948) is an American politician of the Republican Party as well as a practicing physician. From 2001 to 2018, he was a member of the Virginia House of Delegates. He represented the 73rd district, made up of parts of the city of Richmond and Henrico County. O'Bannon was born in Richmond, Virginia. He received his medical degree from the Medical College of Virginia (now officially known as Virginia Commonwealth University School of Medicine) in 1973 and is board certified in neurology. With his wife, Patricia, he has three children: John H. O'Bannon, Virginia Deasy, and Andrew O'Bannon. He was a member of the committees on Appropriations, Health, Welfare and Institutions, and Privileges and Elections.

Notes

References

Delegate John O'Bannon; Serving Virginia's 73rd House District (Constituent/campaign website)

External links

1948 births
Living people
Republican Party members of the Virginia House of Delegates
University of Richmond alumni
Medical College of Virginia alumni
People from Henrico County, Virginia
21st-century American politicians